Channel 31 (call sign CTN-31) was a free-to-air community television station in Sydney. The station began broadcasting in 1993 as Australia's first metropolitan community television station.

The licence of its operator, Community Television Sydney, was revoked by the Australian Broadcasting Authority and given to rival Television Sydney in March 2004. Channel 31's licence was temporarily extended pending a federal court hearing on the issue, but the station ultimately ceased operations at midnight on 23 April 2004.

References

External links
Official website (archived site)

Television stations in New South Wales
Television channels and stations established in 1993
Television channels and stations disestablished in 2004
Defunct television channels in Australia
English-language television stations in Australia
1993 establishments in Australia
2004 disestablishments in Australia
Television stations in Sydney